Crossandra is a genus of plants in the family Acanthaceae, comprising 54  species that occur in Africa, Madagascar, Arabia and the Indian subcontinent. Some species, especially Crossandra infundibuliformis, are cultivated for their brightly colored flowers.

Species
Species in the genus include:

 Crossandra acutiloba Vollesen
 Crossandra albolineata Benoist
 Crossandra angolensis S.Moore
 Crossandra arenicola Vollesen
 Crossandra armandii Benoist
 Crossandra baccarinii Fiori
 Crossandra benoistii Vollesen
 Crossandra cephalostachya Mildbr.
 Crossandra cinnabarina Vollesen
 Crossandra cloiselii S.Moore
 Crossandra douillotii Benoist
 Crossandra flava Hook.
 Crossandra flavicaulis Vollesen
 Crossandra friesiorum Mildbr.
 Crossandra fruticulosa Lindau
 Crossandra grandidieri (Baill.) Benoist
 Crossandra greenstockii S.Moore
 Crossandra horrida Vollesen
 Crossandra humbertii Benoist
 Crossandra infundibuliformis (L.) Nees
 Crossandra isaloensis Vollesen
 Crossandra johanninae Fiori
 Crossandra leikipiensis Schweinf.
 Crossandra leucodonta Vollesen
 Crossandra longehirsuta Vollesen
 Crossandra longipes S.Moore
 Crossandra longispica Benoist
 Crossandra massaica Mildbr.
 Crossandra mucronata Lindau
 Crossandra multidentata Vollesen
 Crossandra nilotica Oliv.
 Crossandra nobilis Benoist
 Crossandra obanensis Heine
 Crossandra pilosa (Benoist) Vollesen
 Crossandra pinguior S.Moore
 Crossandra poissonii Benoist
 Crossandra praecox Vollesen
 Crossandra primuloides Lindau
 Crossandra puberula Klotzsch
 Crossandra pungens Lindau
 Crossandra pyrophila Vollesen
 Crossandra quadridentata Benoist
 Crossandra raripila Benoist
 Crossandra rupestris Benoist
 Crossandra spinescens Dunkley
 Crossandra spinosa Beck
 Crossandra stenandrium (Nees) Lindau
 Crossandra stenostachya (Lindau) C.B.Clarke
 Crossandra strobilifera (Lam.) Benoist
 Crossandra subacaulis C.B.Clarke
 Crossandra sulphurea G.Taylor
 Crossandra tridentata Lindau
 Crossandra tsingyensis Vollesen
 Crossandra vestita Benoist

References

Acanthaceae
Acanthaceae genera